NBN News may refer to television news services operated by:

NBN television station owned and operated by Nine in Australia
People's Television Network in the Philippines